The Castle of Monforte (Portuguese; Castelo de Monforte), also referred to as  Castelo de Monforte de Rio Livre, is a medieval castle located in the Águas Frias parish, Monforte de village, Chaves municipality in Vila Real district of Portugal.

History

Early History
Archaeological evidence indicates that the early human occupation of its site dates back to Neolithic Times. When the Roman conducted their invasion of the Iberian Peninsula, the region was occupied due to the proximity of the settlement with Roman road that linked Astorga to Braga.

Medieval Era 
In 1273, the town received a Foral charter from King Afonso III (1248-1279).

The town received a confirmation Foral Charter from King Afonso IV.

During the 1383-1385 Portuguese succession crisis, the village and castle sided with Beatriz, but she was defeated and the village was forced to accept John I (1385-1433). It is believed that during this time, the castle was constructed and later the castle site plan was recorded in the Duarte de Armas (Book of Fortresses c. 1509).

Post Middle Ages 
In Portuguese Restoration War for Independence, the Council of War John IV (1640-1656) determined the modernization of defenses Monforte was necessary by adapting them to fire artillery. Thus, they were erected a half-bastion and other structures in the east of the medieval Donjon tower.

20th Century to modern day 
By the 20th century, the quality of the castle had slowly declined. The village has been abandoned.

The Portuguese government subsequently declared the castle of Monforte to be a National Monument on 5 January 1950. 

Currently, the area surrounding the castle hosts every summer, a busy recreation of medieval fair with costumes, games and time items.

Architecture 
The medieval castle is constructed walls of granite, which is abundantly found in the region. They stand in fair condition. The castle is accessible by two doors:
 the Village Gate,
 It stands in the West. it is wider and provides easy access to the village
 Port of Betrayal, the South in round arch
 It is in the South and is much narrower.
The top of the walls is covered by a battlement that can only be accessed through a door from inside the Keep. This presents quadrangular, crowned by a row of tripartite corbels and is divided internally into three floors, illuminated by torn cracks in the walls.

The former about the village where originally tore three gates, there remains only the call Galeao door.

References 

Monforte
Monforte
Chaves, Portugal